Lothar Kremershof was a German ice hockey player.

Career 
Born in Krefeld, Kremershof was the starting striker for the Krefeld Pinguine, with whom he won the local title in 1977. He then went to DEG Metro Stars which at the time was named Düsseldorf EC. At Düsseldorf EC he went on to score 27 goals and assisted in 57 in 42 games during the 1979–80 ice hockey Bundesliga season.

After his playing career ended he we went on to coach teams such as Grefrather EV and Neuss SC.

References

1953 births
2003 deaths
German ice hockey forwards
Krefeld Pinguine players